Putu Dini Jasita Utami (born 8 January 1994) is an Indonesian beach volleyball player. Born in Gianyar, Bali, Utami now reside in Lombok, West Nusa Tenggara. As a beach volleyball player, Utami teamed-up with Dhita Juliana since 2011. Juliana and Utami won the gold medal for the West Nusa Tenggara province at the 2012 Pekan Olahraga Nasional held in Riau. In the international event, she and Juliana was the gold medalist at the 2013 Islamic Solidarity Games. She also won the bronze medal at the 2014 Asian Beach Games in Phuket, Thailand. In 2018, she claimed the bronze medal at the Asian Games.

Utami graduated in the sports science discipline at the IKIP Mataram in 2017.

References

External links
 
 

1994 births
Living people
People from Gianyar Regency
Sportspeople from Bali
Indonesian beach volleyball players
Indonesian Hindus
Asian Games bronze medalists for Indonesia
Asian Games medalists in beach volleyball
Medalists at the 2018 Asian Games
Beach volleyball players at the 2018 Asian Games
Competitors at the 2019 Southeast Asian Games
Southeast Asian Games silver medalists for Indonesia
Southeast Asian Games medalists in volleyball
Islamic Solidarity Games competitors for Indonesia
21st-century Indonesian women